Fissicrambus haytiellus, the carpet-grass webworm moth, is a moth in the family Crambidae. It was described by Zincken in 1821. It is found in the Dominican Republic, Cuba and the United States, where it has been recorded from Alabama, Florida, North Carolina and Texas.

References

Crambini
Moths described in 1821
Moths of North America